A seven-part referendum and popular consultation was held in Ecuador on Sunday, February 4, 2018, to reform the constitution and consult citizens on issues of national importance. The consultation was announced on October 2, 2017, by President Lenin Moreno. The ballot consisted of seven questions for voters to approve or reject.

Background
On the night of September 4, 2017, President Moreno made the first announcement about the Popular Consultation, where he indicated that the possibility of calling it was under analysis. Two weeks later, on September 18, 2017, the president summoned citizens interested in sending questions for analysis and possible incorporation to the consultation.

President Moreno, without approval of the Constitutional Court, made an executive decree to allow the Popular Consultation. When in 2015, Rafael Correa urged the CNE to execute the Popular Consultation in La Manga del Cura in 2015, he had previously been directed by the Constitutional Court on June 24 to issue the executive decree to hold the plebiscite.

Quotes

Referendum

Popular consultation

Opinion polls

Results

References

2018 in Ecuador
2018 referendums
February 2018 events in South America 
2018